Tiarnie Coupland (born 16 April 1997) is an Australian actress, model and singer. She has appeared in numerous films, TV series, short films, TV commercials and theatre productions.

On 23 January 2015 Coupland released her debut song "Focus".

Coupland was nominated for a Logie Award for Best New Talent in 2017 for her role as Maggie in Love Child.

Coupland is signed to modeling agency IMG Models. In 2017, she was selected to be the face of Sportsgirl's "Urban Folk" collection, and jewellery retailer Jan Logan's "Amavi" collection.

Filmography

Awards

References

Further reading

External links 
 
 

Australian television actresses
1997 births
Living people